Jean-Guy Dubois (born 2 April 1948 in Sainte-Cécile-de-Lévrard, Quebec) was a Liberal Party member of the House of Commons of Canada. He was a lawyer and professor by career.

He represented the Lotbinière electoral district after winning that seat in the 1980 federal election, serving in the 31st and 32nd Canadian Parliaments. He made two earlier unsuccessful bids for the riding, the first in an October 1978 by-election and then in the 1979 federal election.

Dubois left national politics after his defeat in the 1984 federal election to Maurice Tremblay, of the Progressive Conservative Party.

External links
 

1948 births
Living people
Members of the House of Commons of Canada from Quebec
Liberal Party of Canada MPs
Academics in Quebec
Lawyers in Quebec